50 Things That Made the Modern Economy is a radio show and podcast on the BBC World Service. It is presented by economist and journalist Tim Harford. The first series was broadcast between 5 November 2016 and 28 October 2017. A second series began on 30 March 2019.

Harford explained in a BBC interview in 2017 that his motivation for creating the show was "to paint a picture of economic change by telling the stories of the ideas, people, and tools that had far-reaching consequences". He was "fascinated" by the many unexpected outcomes, such as "the impact of the fridge on global politics, or of the gramophone on income inequality."

Towards the end of the first series, a public call was made for suggestions of a "51st thing". Harford chose six submissions for an online vote. The winning item was announced as the credit card in an episode on 28 October 2017. A bonus episode about Santa Claus was broadcast on 24 December 2018.

The first series was published in Britain as Fifty Things That Made The Modern Economy. by Little, Brown, and as Fifty Inventions That Shaped The Modern Economy in the US by Riverhead. Reviews of the book were mixed. 

The show won a silver award for "Best Radio Podcast supported by UK Radioplayer" at the 2017 British Podcast Awards.

Episodes

Series 1 (2016–2017)
Each of the nine-minute long programmes introduces the story of a product or invention that revolutionised the modern world.

Each episode was originally broadcast on BBC World Service, with a subsequent broadcast on BBC Radio 4 and distribution as a BBC podcast.

Special (2018)
A bonus episode on Santa Claus was broadcast on 24 December 2018. This included the announcement of the series 2 for March 2019.

Series 2 (2019)

Bonus episodes
The series 1 episode on the Index Fund was re-released with additional comments by Harford in the podcast feed to commemorate the death of John C. Bogle.

A number of episodes of the parallel BBC radio documentary series 30 Animals That Made Us Smarter were included as bonuses in the podcast feed of early episodes of series 2.

"51st thing"
The shortlist selected by Harford for public vote as the 51st thing was:
 Credit card
 Glass
 Global Positioning System (GPS)
 Irrigation
 Pencil
 Spreadsheet

The item selected by public vote was the credit card, announced by Harford in the episode entitled "Number 51".

Book
Each of the short chapters describes fifty products or inventions that have revolutionised the modern world. The chapter order is different from the radio broadcast and podcast order. Some book chapters have modified titles, and the chapters are grouped into sections in the book.

See also
 :Category:Lists of inventions or discoveries
A History of the World in 100 Objects
 List of business and finance podcasts

References

External links
 
 BBC World Service episode guide
 Financial Times review of podcast

2016 radio programme debuts
BBC World Service programmes
British documentary radio programmes
British podcasts
Business and finance podcasts
Educational broadcasting in the United Kingdom
History of technology
History podcasts
Radio programs about economics
Technology podcasts
Works about economic history
Works about the history of industries
2016 podcast debuts